Ramón Kobashigawa Kobashigawa (24 August 1939 – 12 July 2019) was a Peruvian Fujimorist politician and a former Congressman, representing the La Libertad Region between 2011 and 2016 under the Popular Force party.

Early life and education 
He carried out his primary studies at the Miguel Grau School and secondary school at the Seminary School San Carlos and San Marcelo and at the San Juan de Trujillo National School. He then studied at the Faculty of Economic Sciences of the National University of Trujillo obtaining the title of Public Accountant.

Political career

Congressman 
In the 2011 elections, he ran for a seat in Congress under the Force 2011 party of Keiko Fujimori, representing La Libertad and was elected for the 2011–2016 term.

Death 
He died on 12 July 2020 at the age of 79, a few weeks before he turned 80.

References 

1939 births
2019 deaths
Peruvian people of Japanese descent
Fujimorista politicians
Members of the Congress of the Republic of Peru
Alliance for Progress (Peru) politicians
People from Trujillo Province, Peru
People from Trujillo, Peru
People from La Libertad Region